Mark Sanborn is an author, professional speaker, and entrepreneur. He is best known for his book The Fred Factor: How Passion In Your Work and Life Can Turn the Ordinary into the Extraordinary. The book, inspired by postman Fred Shea, sold over 2 million copies worldwide and became a New York Times, Wall Street Journal, USA Today bestseller.

Early life
Sanborn graduated with cum laude from Ohio State University. After graduating, he worked as an account executive, regional manager and associate publisher. In 1978-79 he served as president for the National FFA Organization, and later served as president for the National Speakers Association.

Career
Sanborn holds a certified speaking professional designation from the National Speakers Association (NSA) and is a member of the Speaker Hall of Fame (CPAE), and Speakers Roundtable. He is also a recipient of the Cavett Award in recognition of his contributions to the speaking profession, and the Ambassador of Free Enterprise Award by Sales & Marketing Executives International.

Sanborn has written and co-authored eight books. He has also authored various videos and audio training programs on leadership, change, teamwork and customer service. His video series “Team Building: How to Motivate and Manage People” made it to the #2 spot for bestselling educational video series in the U.S.

He is also the president of Sanborn & Associates, Inc., a leadership development company. Leadershipgurus.net lists Mark as one of the top 30 leadership experts in the world. He is an adjunct professor at the University of Memphis.

Sanborn is the Leadership Expert in Residence at High Point University.

Bibliography
Teambuilt: Making Teamwork Work, Master Media Pub Corp, 1994. 
The Fred Factor: Every Person's Guide to Making the Ordinary Extraordinary!, Executive Books, 2002. 
You Don't Need a Title to Be a Leader: How Anyone, Anywhere, Can Make a Positive Difference, Crown Business, 2006. ASIN: B000JMKR9S
Developing Leaders in Business and Life, Made for Success, 2008. ASIN: B001BZIWY4
The Encore Effect: How to Achieve Remarkable Performance in Anything You Do, Crown Business, 2008. ASIN: B001EW52FG
Encore Effect, Random House Business, 2009. 
Up, Down, or Sideways: How to Succeed When Times Are Good, Bad, or In Between, Oasis Audio, 2011. ASIN: B005RTV936
Fred 2.0: New Ideas on How to Keep Delivering Extraordinary Results, Tyndale House Publishers, 2013.

Awards
NidoQubein Philanthropy Award, NSA Foundation
Cavett Award, National Speakers Association Free Enterprise Award
Inducted into the Speaker Hall of Fame
SMEI Ambassador of Free Enterprise award
Global Top Gurus Award

References

External links
 
 Fred Factor
 You Don't Need a Title
 Encore Effect

American motivational speakers
Living people
Year of birth missing (living people)
Place of birth missing (living people)
20th-century American writers
21st-century American writers
Ohio State University alumni
20th-century American male writers